Cristo Tofa (born 11 December 1987) is a New Zealand rugby union player. She has played two tests for the Black Ferns; she currently plays for Hurricanes Poua in the Super Rugby Aupiki competition, having previously played for the Blues Women.

Rugby career

2014–18 
Tofa took up rugby at the age of 26; four years later she was called into the Black Ferns squad and made her test debut against Australia in 2018. She played in both test matches against Australia.

2020 
In 2020 she featured for the Probables against the Possibles in a Black Ferns trial match. She donned the Black Ferns jersey again and played against the New Zealand Barbarians at Waitakere.

2021–22 
Tofa was selected for the Blues women's team in a historic match-up with the Chiefs in 2021. Later that year she was signed by the Blues for the inaugural season of Super Rugby Aupiki in 2022. She featured in their 0–35 thrashing by the Chiefs Manawa in the final round.

2023 
Tofa moved to Hurricanes Poua for the 2023 Super Rugby Aupiki season.

References

External links 

 Black Ferns Profile

1987 births
Living people
New Zealand women's international rugby union players
New Zealand female rugby union players